Pleasure and Pain is the seventh studio album by the Italian gothic metal band Theatres des Vampires. It is the first album after Lord Vampyr's departure, and the first to feature Sonya Scarlet as the main vocalist of the band as well as being the last to feature Robert Cufaro on guitar.

Track listing

Bonus Tracks

Line-Up 
Sonya Scarlet − vocals
Fabian Varesi − keyboards, backing vocal
Gabriel Valerio − drums
Zimon Lijoi − bass, backing vocal
Robert Cufaro − guitars

Guest Members 
Flegias (Necrodeath) − male scream on "Forever in Death"
Dhilorz (Ancient) − male scream on "Black Mirror"
Nicholas (Ensoph) − male clean voice on "Pleasure and Pain"
Giampaolo Caprino (Stormlord) − male clean voice on all tracks.

Theatres des Vampires albums
2005 albums